Lauda Sion (Praise Zion), Op. 73, is an extended composition by Felix Mendelssohn. He set parts of Lauda Sion, a sequence in Latin for Corpus Christi in 1846. The piece in eight movements is scored for soloists, a four-part choir and orchestra.

History 
Mendelssohn was ready to set music for different denominations. He received a commission for a setting of the Lauda Sion sequence from a Belgian church musician, to be performed at the church St. Martin in Liège in 1846, commemorating the feast's 600th anniversary. Mendelssohn began the work in 1845, at the same time as his oratorio Elijah, and completed it in 1846. It was published after his death, in 1848. Carus published it in a critical edition in 1896.

Music 
Mendelssohn structured the text in eight movements:
 Lauda Sion Salvatorem
 Laudis thema specialis
 Sit laus plena
 In hac mensa
 Docti sacris institutis
 Sub diversis speciebus
 Caro cibus
 Sumit unus

References

External links 
 

Compositions by Felix Mendelssohn
1846 compositions